Hamsika Iyer (born 12 April 1972) is an Indian singer based in Mumbai. She is a regular voice with ad world jingles and Marathi tele-serials, and has sung songs in Kannada, Tamil, Hindi, Malayalam and Bengali movies.

International collaborations and tours

Hamsika is the Indian vocalist for Prem Joshua's 2014 album Kashi.
Hamsika is a performer for the international band Juno Reactor since 2012.
In August 2012, Hamsika performed with musician Aamir John Hadad's band Zoobazar in Valencia, España.
November 2011, Hamsika was featured along with the Rajagopalan Quartet at UrbanFOLK Bangalore. 
In September 2011, Hamsika sang "Chammak Challo" with Akon for the film Ra.One.

Discography
 "Main Faraar Sa" - Running Shaadi (2017) with Anupam Roy (music by Anupam Roy)
 Kashi (2014) with Prem Joshua & Chintan, as Indian vocalist in the album
 "Ninna Danigaagi" (Version 1) – Savaari 2 (2014) with Karthik (music by Manikanth Kadri)
 "Bekhauff" – Marathi – Satyamev Jayate (2014)
 "1 2 3 4 Get on the Dance Floor" – Chennai Express (2013) with Vishal Dadlani, Sricharan Kasturirangan (music by Vishal-Shekhar)
 Vishwaroopam (2012), backing vocals on "Unnai Kaanadhu" (music by Shankar-Ehsaan-Loy)
 Delhi Safari (2012) (music by Shankar-Ehsaan-Loy)
 "Lonely" – Khiladi 786 (2012) with Himesh Reshammiya, Yo Yo Honey Singh 
 "Alai Payuthe" – English Vinglish (Tamil Dubbed), music by Amit Trivedi (2012)
 Satyamev Jayate TV series, Music by Ram Sampath – "Sakhi", "Rupaiya", "Ghar Yaad Aata Hai" (Tamil/Telugu/Malayalam versions), "Chanda Pe Dance" (all languages, except Hindi)
 "Kala Kalyat" – Hridayanath (2012), Marathi (music by Santosh Muley)
 "Kanna Mucche" – Amet Asal Eemet Kusal (2012), music by Umang Doshi, Tulu
 Abhimaan Geet by Kaushal Inamdar (2007), Marathi
 "Mann Chimb Paavasaali" – Ajintha (2012), Marathi
 "Lal Hori" (Chhand Othaatale) – Ajintha (2012) with Suresh Wadkar, Swanand Kirkire, Kaushal Inamdar
 "Raabta (Siyaah Raatein)" – Agent Vinod (2012) with Arijit Singh, Joy
 "Chhaya Bhitu Chhaya" – Aparajita Tumi (2012), Bengali
 "Chammak Challo" – Ra.One (2011) with Akon
 "Jay Jagadish" – Ganaraj Adhiraj (2011) with Salim Merchant and Gulraj Singh
 "Jhoola Jhool" – Stanley Ka Dabba (2011)
 "Athadilo Edo" – Kudirithe Cup Coffee (2011), Telugu
 "Lalita" (vocals) – Spirit and Spice (2010), George Brooks
 "Ishq Barse" – Raajneeti (2010) with Pranab Biswas, Swanand Kirkire
 "Ninagende Vishesha" – Prithvi (2010) with Kunal Ganjawala (music by Manikanth Kadri)
 "Kuchi Kuchi Twist" – Quick Gun Murugun (2009) with Vijay Prakash
 "Jheeni Jheeni" – Phir Kabhi (2009) with Bhupinder Singh
 "Urrat Dhadhdhad" – Sunder Mazhe Ghar (2009), Marathi
 "Kadhaigal Pesum" – Angaadi Theru (2009) with Benny Dayal
 "Chaal Apni" – Sikandar (2009) with Rishikesh Kamerkar
 "Fallen" – 3 Cities (2008) with Bombay Dub Orchestra
 "Bagundey Bagundey" – Chintakayala Ravi (2008) with Vijay Prakash
 "Khushboo Sa" – Khoya Khoya Chand (2007)
 "Raaz ki ek baat" – Its Breaking News (2007) with Bhushan Marathe, Clinton
 "Haqeeqat ne aisa pakda girebaan" – Its Breaking News (2007)
 Loins of Punjab Presents (2007)
 "Maa tere haath, Jaane kyun aisa lagta hai" – Meri Awaz Ko Mil Gayi Roshni (2007)
 "Chanda re" (The moon song) – Eklavya: The Royal Guard (2007)
 "The love theme" – Eklavya: The Royal Guard (2007)
 "Mugurtha neram" – Mercury Pookal (2006) with Kunal Ganjawala
 Kal - Yesterday And Tomorrow (2005)
 "Saawalith Majhya" – Not Only Mrs. Raut (2003)
 "Jheel jaisi teri aankhen" – Jajantaram Mamantaram (2003) with Narayan Parasuram
 "Pyaar se dekh le" – Calcutta Mail (2003) with Sonu Nigam

She has also sung songs with the band 3 Brothers & a Violin for the Karadi Tales audio book series for kids.

Concerts
 Juno Reactor, Tours of 2012
Venue: Asia Tour (Japan), Middle East Tour (Jerusalem), Kubana Festival Russia

 Vivek Rajagopalan Quartet – November 2011
Venue: UrbanFolk Bangalore
Vivek Rajagopalan is a percussionist and musician based in Mumbai. This concert was sponsored by Taj Vivanta.

References

21st-century Indian singers
Indian women playback singers
Tamil singers
Living people
Singers from Pune
Singers from Mumbai
Women Carnatic singers
Carnatic singers
Women musicians from Maharashtra
21st-century Indian women singers
Juno Reactor members
1975 births